Matthew Byndloss (1721-1765)  was a member of the House of Assembly of Jamaica for Saint Ann Parish. He was killed during a slave rebellion at Whitehall plantation.

References 

1721 births
1765 deaths
Saint Ann Parish
Members of the House of Assembly of Jamaica
Planters of Jamaica